The 2012 IIHF U20 Challenge Cup of Asia was the first IIHF U20 Challenge Cup of Asia, an annual international ice hockey tournament held by the International Ice Hockey Federation (IIHF). It took place between 27 May and 1 June 2011 in Seoul, South Korea. Russia, represented by the MHL Red Stars, won the tournament after winning all four of their round robin games and finishing first in the standings. Japan finished second and South Korea finished in third place.

Overview
The 2012 IIHF U20 Challenge Cup of Asia began on 27 May 2012 in Seoul, South Korea will all of the games being played at the Mok-Dong Arena. Russia was represented by the MHL Red Stars, a selection of under-19 players from the Russian Minor Hockey League. The MHL Red Stars won the tournament after winning all four of their games and finishing first in the standings. Japan finished second, losing to Russia and winning in overtime against South Korea who finished in third place. Makuru Furuhashi of Japan finished as the tournaments leading scoring with 17 points, including 12 goals and five assists. Russia's Vasili Demchenko and Vsevolod Kondrashov finished as the leading goaltenders, both with a save percentage of 1.000.

Standings

Fixtures
All times local.

Scoring leaders
List shows the top ten skaters sorted by points, then goals, assists, and the lower penalties in minutes.

Leading goaltenders
Only the top goaltenders, based on save percentage, who have played at least 40% of their team's minutes are included in this list.

References

External links
International Ice Hockey Federation

Chal
IIHF Challenge Cups of Asia
International ice hockey competitions hosted by South Korea
IIHF U20 Challenge Cup of Asia
Asian ice hockey competitions for junior teams